Lumber is processed wood in North American English, corresponding to timber in the rest of the English speaking world.

Lumber may also refer to:

 Lumber room, a room to store currently un-needed furniture

Places

Norway
 Lumber (Kristiansand), a neighbourhood in the city of Kristiansand

United States
 Lumber, Arkansas, an unincorporated community in Arkansas
 Lumber City, Georgia, a city in Telfair County, Georgia
 Lumber, West Virginia, an unincorporated community in West Virginia
 Lumber River, a river in North Carolina
 Lumber Bridge, North Carolina, a town in Robeson County, North Carolina
 Lumber Township, Cameron County, Pennsylvania, a township in Pennsylvania

See also 
 Lumber City (disambiguation)